Vladimir Petrovich Korotkov (born 27 August 1941 in Noginsk) is a Russian professional football coach and a former player. Currently he works as an assistant to the president of FC Lokomotiv Moscow.

External links
 

1941 births
People from Noginsk
Living people
Soviet footballers
FC Shinnik Yaroslavl players
FC Lokomotiv Moscow players
Russian football managers
FC Spartak Moscow players
Association football forwards
FC Yenisey Krasnoyarsk players
Sportspeople from Moscow Oblast